Bára Gísladóttir (b. 1989) is an Icelandic composer and double bassist, currently based in Copenhagen. 

She often performs with longtime collaborator Skúli  Sverrisson. She is the double bassist of Elja Ensemble.

Bára has said that her work is concerned with the qualities of sound.

Biography
Born in Reykjavík on 21 November 1989, Bára played the violin from an early age, specialising in double bass from her teens onwards. She studied composition at the Royal Danish Academy of music where she completed a Masters Degree and an Advanced Postgraduate Diploma under the guidance of Niels Rosing-Schow and Jeppe Just Christensen. Prior to that she studied composition at the Milan Conservatory with Gabriele Manca and earned a Bachelors Degree at the Iceland Academy of Arts with Hróðmar I. Sigurbjörnsson and Þuríður Jónsdóttir.

Bára has released four albums. Her debut, Different Rooftops, came out in 2015, and contained works that included voice, electronics, saxophone, and double bass. the 2016 follow-up, B R I M S L Ó Ð, employed double bass and electronics across three movements. A 2017 album entitled Mass for some contained compositions for double bass, electronics, and voice. HĪBER, released in 2020, utilised electronics and double bass. A 2021 release is planned for 'Caeli', a collaboration with Skúli Sverrisson.

Prizes
Bára has received the Carl Nielsen and Anne Marie Carl-Nielsen Foundation’s Talent Awards, the Léonie Sonning Talent Prize, and won the "Shout Out" award at The Reykjavík Grapevine Music Awards. She was nominated at the Icelandic Music Awards in 2019 and 2020 for "piece of the year" and the Carl Prize in 2020 as "Composer of the Year - Chamber Ensemble".

Discography
 Different Rooftops (2015)
 B R I M S L Ó Ð (2016)
 Mass for some (2017, Mengi Records)
 HĪBER (2020, Dacapo Records)
 SILVA (2023, Sono Luminus)

References

External links
 Bára Gísladóttir's website
 Bára's Soundcloud Profile

1989 births
Living people
Bara Gisladottir
Bara Gisladottir
Bara Gisladottir
21st-century composers
21st-century women composers